The 12253 / 12254 Anga Weekly Express is a train connecting Bhagalpur (BGP), the second largest city of Bihar, to Sir M. Visvesvaraya Terminal, Bengaluru (SMVB) 
in Bangalore, via Munger's , Kolkata's Dankuni Junction, Bhubaneswar, Visakhapatnam and Vijayawada. In February 2017, the train was provided with the new LHB coach.

History

The Anga Express was introduced because of the growing demand for the train service from the Anga region to Bangalore. Many of the software professionals working in Bangalore were from the districts of Munger and Bhagalpur. Prior to the Anga Express, they used to travel to Bangalore on the Sanghamithra Superfast Express or the Howrah–SMVT Bengaluru Humsafar Express.

Timing 

 12253 – Starts from  every Saturday at 13:30 HRS IST and reaches  Monday at 8:45 AM IST
 12254 – Starts from  every Wednesday and reaches  on Friday at 9:05 AM IST.

Direction reversal

The train reverses its direction thrice at; 
  (VSKP), 

  (KIUL).

Route & halts

Traction

It is hauled by a Howrah-based WAP-4 / WAP-7 locomotive from BGP till VSKP. From VSKP till YPR it is hauled by a Lallaguda-based WAP-7 locomotive and vice versa.

References 

Transport in Bangalore
Transport in Bhagalpur
Express trains in India
Rail transport in Bihar
Rail transport in Karnataka
Rail transport in Tamil Nadu
Rail transport in Andhra Pradesh
Rail transport in West Bengal
Rail transport in Odisha
Rail transport in Jharkhand
Named passenger trains of India